Country Girl, the third album by English singer-songwriter Rebecca Hollweg, was released on 9 February 2015 on Emu Records. The title track samples a recording of the "Mind the gap" announcement by Oswald Laurence which is used at Embankment station on the London Underground to warn passengers about the gap between the train and the platform.

Production and launch
The album, which was produced and recorded by Andy Hamill at Emu's Nest Studios in London, was mixed by Andy Hamill and Chris Lewis and was mastered by Chris Lewis. It was launched at the Cavendish Arms in Stockwell, London on 23 November 2014.

Reception
Reviewing Country Girl for Uncut magazine, Mick Houghton gave it 8 of 10, describing it as "another delightful batch of tunes" and adding: "The title track sets the tone, a jaunty, bass-driven, tongue-in-cheek look at city life, 'Ruby' is sung to her daughter and would have fitted snugly on any Carpenters’ album."

The title track was played on BBC Radio 2 by Janice Long and by Robert Elms on his BBC London 94.9 radio show. Jamie Cullum played the song "Light" on his BBC Radio 2 programme on 3 March 2015, saying "a great singer who I love very much... a real great listen from start to finish... this great, great album".

Track listing
 "Country Girl" (Rebecca Hollweg)
 "Ruby" (Rebecca Hollweg)
 "The Week" (Rebecca Hollweg)
 "Come Home to Me" (Rebecca Hollweg)
 "Camelia" (Rebecca Hollweg)
 "Word" (Rebecca Hollweg)
 "Light" (Rebecca Hollweg)
 "Happy Here" (Rebecca Hollweg)
 "Eden" (Rebecca Hollweg)
 "Telescopic" (music by Chris Bowden, lyrics by Rebecca Hollweg)

Personnel
 Rebecca Hollweg – vocals, acoustic guitar on "Light"
 Andy Hamill – double bass, bass guitar, harmonica, cello, glockenspiel, alto clarinet, flugelhorn, tuba, music boxes, backing vocals
 Ruby Hamill – backing vocals
 Julian Ferraretto  – violin, viola, mandolin, musical saw
 Tom Gordon – drums, percussion
 Lucas Hollweg – trombone on "Happy Here"
 Mike Outram – electric and acoustic guitars, banjo
 Phil Peskett – piano
The strings were arranged by Julian Ferraretto and Andy Hamill

Album cover
The CD cover was designed by Jeb Loy Nichols and incorporates photographs by Emily Bowling.

Notes and references

External links
 Rebecca Hollweg's official website
 Rebecca Hollweg's podcasts

2015 albums
Rebecca Hollweg albums
London Underground in popular culture